Sigma level may refer to a:
 measurement of defects in the Six Sigma business management strategy
 atmospheric pressure measured in a sigma coordinate system